Avon High School is a public high school for grades 9–12 located in Avon, Ohio, United States. Athletic teams are known as the Eagles and play in the Southwestern Conference as of the 2018–2019 school year. The current Avon High School opened in 1998, located on 37 acres of land on Detroit Road. The school is two stories tall and was built for 800 students with room to expand it for 1,600 students.

Sports
Avon is currently a member of the Southwestern Conference, as of 2015. The current head football coach is Mike Elder, who took over the program in 2007. Their football team has been in the state tournament in 1996, 2004, 2008, 2010, 2011, 2012, 2013, 2014, 2015, 2016, 2017, 2018, 2019, and 2020. They made state appearances in 1996, 2011, 2017, 2018, 2019, and 2020. In 2011, they lost to Trotwood Madison in the Division II State Championship 42–28.

Their boys cross country team finished 3rd in the OHSAA Boys Division II State Championship in 2010.  They finished 1st in the OHSAA Boys Division II Region 6 Tiffin Regional.  They finished 1st in the OHSAA Boys Division II Northeast District race at Lorain County Community College.

Other extracurricular activities 
In 2018, the schools band placed first at the Maumee Music in Motion competition. They won 4 awards which consisted of Grand Champion, Best Music, Best General Effect, and Best Percussion. There were 110 band members that participated in winning these awards.

Academics 
In 2018, Avon high school had a graduation rate of 98%. Avon scored 79% in mathematics proficiency, while receiving a score of 83% in reading proficiency. Out of the 1,193 kids that went to Avon high school in 2018, 39% of the students participate in AP classes. When it came to testing 75% of the students passed their exams.

References

External links
Avon High School website

High schools in Lorain County, Ohio
Public high schools in Ohio